Liyana binti Jasmay (born 28 March 1988) is a Malaysian actress, singer, producer and director.

Career
Jasmay's first acting role came in 1997 when she was only nine years old in a TV drama called Si Lembik. The story is similar to the Hollywood film The Little Rascals, where little kids play the roles of adults. It was produced and directed by Aznil Hj Nawawi.

Over the years, Jasmay has made herself a household name by acting in numerous TV drama and TV series including Dendam Terlerai, Balqis, Orang Kasar, Cinta Sempadan, Najwa, and Cinta Si Rempit.

She then made her first silver-screen role in a highly promoted film Castello, where she starred alongside Rosyam Nor. The role earned Jasmay her first Malaysian Film Festival 2006 nomination for the Best New Actress Award.

Her career soared and she won a Best Actress Award for Malaysian Film Festival 2009 for her role in the film Papadom and a Best Actress Award for her role in an indie-gone-mainstream film KAMI.

Jasmay directed and produced a telemovie entitled #SoKampung under her production company, Mermaid Studios, thus marking her directorial debut. This was followed by a teen drama The Gadis.

Personal life
Jasmay married her longtime love, Malaysian businessman Fathuddin Mazlan, on 2 February 2013. They have two daughters, born in 2014 and 2016.

Academics
In 2012, Jasmay went to Manhattan, New York City, undergoing acting and screenwriting/directing courses in New York Film Academy for six months, accompanied by her mother. She is a graduate of Diploma of Performance Art and Media from Sunway University.

Endorsements
Jasmay was the Malaysian Ambassador for Maybelline in 2009 and held the role for three years. She has been the Ambassador for ASAP Smoke Free Lifestyle Campaign since 2011.

Filmography

Film

Television series

Telemovie

Television

Music videos

Discography
 LJ (2009)

Singles

References

External links
 
 
 Liyana Jasmay at portal Sinema Malaysia

1988 births
Living people
Malaysian people of Malay descent
Malaysian television actresses
Malaysian women pop singers
Malaysian rhythm and blues singers
Malaysian pop rock singers
Malaysian Muslims
Malaysian television personalities
People from Pahang
Malay-language singers
20th-century Malaysian actresses
21st-century Malaysian actresses
Malaysian child actresses
21st-century Malaysian women singers